Le Marigot is a village and commune in the French overseas department of Martinique.

Population

See also
Communes of Martinique

References

External links

Communes of Martinique
Populated places in Martinique